Bent Farmhouse is in Bent Lane in the village of Warburton, Greater Manchester, England, opposite the church of St Werburgh.  It is recorded in the National Heritage List for England as a designated Grade II listed building.

History

The house was built in 1600 by Robert Drinkwater.  It was a timber-framed house which was restored in 1880 by the Chester architect John Douglas for Rowland Egerton-Warburton of Arley Hall, who added "Douglas-like features and character".

Architecture

The house is built on a stone plinth.  It has a brick front with terracotta dressings and much timber framing elsewhere.  Douglas' restoration is described as being "heavy" and "interesting".

See also

Listed buildings in Warburton, Greater Manchester
List of houses and associated buildings by John Douglas

References

Grade II listed buildings in the Metropolitan Borough of Trafford
Houses completed in 1600
Houses completed in 1880
Houses in Greater Manchester
John Douglas buildings
Farmhouses in England
Grade II listed houses